Communist Party of India (Marxist–Leninist) New Democracy is a communist political party in India. The party was founded as a breakaway from the Communist Party of India (Marxist-Leninist) (Chandra Pulla Reddy) in 1988. The general secretary of this party is Yatendra Kumar.

The party is mainly based in Telangana and Andhra Pradesh, but also has branches in Bihar, West Bengal, Punjab, Uttar Pradesh, Maharashtra, Delhi, Odisha, Haryana, etc.

The party has one member in the Legislative Assembly of Andhra Pradesh, Gummadi Narsaiah from the constituency of Yellandu from where he has been elected continuously for five terms. The party also has one from Bihar, whose name is Umadhar Prasad Singh.

CPI (ML) ND has been following both parliamentary and non-parliamentary methods of class struggle. It participates in elections unlike the Communist Party of India (Maoist) and also has an underground guerrilla army with weapons. The party has open mass organizations like the Indian Federation of Trade Unions (IFTU) for industrial workers and the All India Kisan-Mazdoor Sabha for farmers and agricultural workers.

In the recent years CPI (ML) ND has been more radicalized and started focusing more on the underground guerrilla work distancing itself from the parliamentary left and the moderate Marxist-Leninist factions.

CPI(M-L) ND has two big students unions, PDSU, and PSU in Punjab.

References

External links
Party website

Communist militant groups
Political parties established in 1988
New Democracy
International Conference of Marxist–Leninist Parties and Organizations (International Newsletter)
Left-wing militant groups in India
Maoist organisations in India
Naxalite–Maoist insurgency